Andrea Glibo (born 5 April 2002) is a Croatian footballer who plays as a forward for Austrian ÖFB-Frauenliga club Sturm Graz and the Croatia women's national team.

References

External links

2002 births
Living people
Women's association football forwards
Croatian women's footballers
Croatia women's international footballers
Croatian expatriate women's footballers
Croatian expatriate sportspeople in Austria
Expatriate women's footballers in Austria
ÖFB-Frauenliga players